Mabel Bagenal ( – December 1595) was an Anglo-Irish noblewoman and Countess of Tyrone, often referred to simplistically as the "Helen of the Elizabethan Wars".

Life
Mabel Bagenal was born around 1571 in Newry. She was the youngest child of Sir Nicholas Bagenal and Eleanor Griffith of Penrhyn, Wales. When her father died in 1590 he charged his son, Henry, with the "careful disposing" of Bagenal through a judicious marriage. Turlough Luineach O'Neill had previously expressed interest in marrying her. The recently widowed Hugh O'Neill, Earl of Tyrone, declared his love for Bagenal and asked to marry her. Hugh Bagenal refused. She was sent to live at Turvey House, County Dublin with her sister Lady Mary Barnewall. Her brother referred the decision to the queen and privy council of England, claiming that his sister was not prepared to live in what he termed an uncivil Gaelic household. A number of prominent officials, including Archbishop Loftus and Sir Geoffrey Fenton, believed that the match could be in the public interest. Bagenal and O'Neill preempted the decision, pledging to marry when he visited her in Turvey in July after which they eloped.

They were married in an Anglican ceremony by Bishop Thomas Jones on 3 July 1591 after the bishop was assured that Bagenal gave free consent.

Her brother was still opposed to the marriage and declared "that my blood which in my father and myself hath often been spilled in repressing this rebellious race, should now be mingled with so traitorous a stock and kindred". He also questioned if O'Neill's divorce from his first wife was authentic, and withheld his sister's £1,000 dowry. O'Neill encouraged his new wife to furnish his castle at Dungannon, intending that she would bring a sense of culture and refinement to the house. She bought tapestries and paintings in London, bringing an Elizabethan aesthetic to the castle. Nothing is recorded of her adjustment to her new life. Against her brother's wishes, she converted to Catholicism, which along with O'Neill's alleged infidelity, stoked his enmity further.

In May 1593 the couple is said to have clashed over the assassination of Phelim mac Turlough O'Neill with "the countess clapping her hands together was sorry, as should seem, of that which happened, to whom the earl in English spoke with vehemency."

Death
Mabel Bagenal O'Neill died in December 1595, either in Dungannon or Newry, having possibly left The O'Neill and lodged a public complaint against him.

It was suggested that a skeleton that was uncovered during an archaeological dig in 2011 could have been that of Lady O'Neill.

References

1570s births
1595 deaths
16th-century Anglo-Irish people
16th-century Irish women
Converts to Roman Catholicism from Anglicanism
Irish nobility
O'Neill dynasty
People from Newry
People of the Nine Years' War (Ireland)